Hussein Dey is a district in Algiers Province, Algeria. It was named after the Ottoman provincial ruler of the Regency of Algiers.

He had installed his country house near the beaches of the suburb of Algiers. On the shores of Hussein Dey had failed in 1541 the ships of the fleet of Charles Quint. Located on the seafront, between the Jardin d’essai, Maison Carree Kouba. Hussein Dey had several counties in its periphery: Leveilley, Brossette, La Montagne, Bel Air, La Cressonnière, Panorama, Eucalyptus, Côte-Blanche, Côte-Rouge, and Lafarge.

Municipalities
The district is further divided into 4 municipalities:
Hussein Dey
Kouba 
El Magharia 
Belouzidad

Notable people

Known personalities from the area include: 
Sidi M'hamed Bou Qobrine, theologian and Sufi
Brahim Boushaki, theologian and Sufi
Mohamed Aïchaoui, journalist, militant activist, politician
Mohamed Arkab, engineer, politician
Mohamed Belouizdad, militant activist, politician
Mohamed Missouri, boxer and coach
Hocine Yahi, football player

References

Districts of Algiers Province